Metamorphosis is the fourth studio album by Iron Butterfly, released on August 13, 1970. It reached number 16 on the US charts. Mike Pinera and Larry "El Rhino" Reinhardt became members of Iron Butterfly in the early part of 1970.

The album was recorded at American Recording studio and produced by Richard Podolor, engineered by Bill Cooper.

The single "Easy Rider" reached number 66 on the Billboard chart, making it the band's biggest hit aside from "In-A-Gadda-Da-Vida". The album is noted for having one of the earliest uses of the talk box on a rock album, which Pinera used on "Butterfly Bleu."

Reception

AllMusic's Stephen Thomas Erlewine rated Metamorphosis three out of five stars. He explained that "the group continued its musical explorations, adding a layered production to its sound." He also stated that "[the] ambition [...] makes for an interesting listen."

Track listing 

Songwriting credits per BMI Records. The album sleeve ambiguously credits the songs to "Iron Butterfly".

Personnel

Iron Butterfly
 Ron Bushy – drums
 Lee Dorman – bass guitar
 Doug Ingle – organ, vocals
 Mike Pinera – guitar, vocals
 Larry Reinhardt – guitar

Additional personnel
 Richard Podolor – producer, sitar, twelve-string guitar
 Bill Cooper – engineer, twelve-string guitar
 Roger Webster – art direction, photography, front cover 
 Bob Jenkins – art direction, photography (inside)
 Robert Blue – back cover art

Charts 
"Easy Rider (Let the Wind Pay the Way)" – Billboard

Singles
US singles
 "Easy Rider (Let the Wind Pay the Way)" b/w "Soldier in Our Town"
 "Stone Believer" b/w "Silly Sally" (Non-LP cut)

Non-US singles
 "Easy Rider (Let the Wind Pay the Way)" b/w "Soldier in Our Town"
 "New Day" b/w "Soldier in Our Town"
 "Best Years of Our Life" b/w "Shady Lady"
 "Silly Sally" b/w "Stone Believer"

References

Iron Butterfly albums
1970 albums
Albums produced by Richard Podolor
Atco Records albums